The Mexican National Heavyweight Championship (called the Campeonato Nacional Completo in Spanish) is a Mexican Lucha Libre (professional wrestling) championship created and sanctioned by the Mexico City Boxing and Wrestling Commission (Spanish: Comisión de Box y Lucha Libre México D.F.). While the Commission sanctions the title, it does not promote the events in which the Championship is defended. From 1933 until the mid-1990s, Consejo Mundial de Lucha Libre (CMLL) controlled the Championship, since then AAA gained control of the championship, after the Commission granted them control of the championship. In 2006 the championship was abandoned and replaced by the AAA Mega Championship. In 2009 the championship became active again on the Mexican Independent circuit until 2013. CMLL brought the championship back in 2017. Since the championship is designated as a heavyweight title, the championship can only officially be competed for by wrestlers weighing at least . However, the regulation is not strictly adhered to.

Championship history
Being a professional wrestling championship, it is not won legitimately: it is instead won via a scripted ending to a match or awarded to a wrestler because of a storyline. The earliest documented use of the Mexican National Heavyweight Title was in 1926 and as such the Mexican National Heavyweight Championship was the oldest continuously promoted wrestling title in the world at the time of its inactivation. The earliest recorded champion was Francisco Aguayo who initially won the title under the name Frank Aguayo while wrestling in border on the US side. He later brought the belt with him to Mexico and on June 21, 1934 firmly established it as a Mexican-based championship with his victory over Manuel "El Toro" Hernández in the first championship match ever sanctioned by the Mexico City Boxing and wrestling commission. At that point Empresa Mexicana de Lucha Libre (EMLL, later renamed CMLL) was given the full promotional control of the title, with the Commission only being asked to approve the champions.

After Pierroth Jr. won the title in 1995, he left CMLL and signed with AAA, bringing the Mexican National Heavyweight Championship with him. When Máscara Sagrada became the champion in 1996, it was officially acknowledged by the Commission that AAA controlled the booking of the championship from that point forward. El Halcón, also billed as Halcón Ortiz and Super Halcón, has the record for most championship reigns, with five. On September 13, 2006, AAA created the new AAA Mega Championship and the National title was not promoted in the promotion. The then champion, Charly Manson left AAA in 2009 and defended the title on the independent circuit. Manson later lost the championship to Héctor Garza until his death on May 23, 2013, after which it became inactive once more. In October 2017 CMLL announced that they were bringing the championship back under their control.

The current champion is Diamante Azul who defeated El Terrible on September 25, 2020. A total of 45 wrestlers have held the championship since its inception, for a total of 66 reigns. The longest Mexican National Heavyweight Championship reign belongs to El Médico Asesino with a total of 1,378 days. El Halcón was champion for the shortest time, 24 days, but also holds the record for most reigns with five in total. Cien Caras's two combined reigns lasted 1,483 days, more than any other champion.

Title history

Combined reigns

Footnotes

References

General
 
 
Specific

Lucha Libre AAA Worldwide championships
Consejo Mundial de Lucha Libre championships
Heavyweight wrestling championships
Mexican national wrestling championships
National professional wrestling championships